The 1968 Colgate Red Raiders football team was an American football team that represented Colgate University as an independent during the 1968 NCAA University Division football season. In its first season under head coach Neil Wheelwright, the team compiled a 5–5 record. Gene Ditwiler was the team captain. 

The team played its home games at Andy Kerr Stadium in Hamilton, New York.

Schedule

Leading players 
Two trophies were awarded to the Red Raiders' most valuable players in 1968: 
 Ronald Burton, quarterback, received the Andy Kerr Trophy, awarded to the most valuable offensive player.
 Dick Schrumpf, linebacker, received the Hal W. Lahar Trophy, awarded to the most valuable defensive player.

Statistical leaders for the 1968 Red Raiders included: 
 Rushing: Dom Fischer, 731 yards and 5 touchdowns on 173 attempts
 Passing: Ronald Burton, 702 yards, 67 completions and 3 touchdowns on 148 attempts
 Receiving: Douglas Hale, 319 yards and 1 touchdown on 30 receptions
 Total offense: Ronald Burton, 1,184 yards (702 passing, 482 rushing)
 Scoring: Gene Detwiler, 48 points from 8 touchdowns
 All-purpose yards: Dominic Fischer, 1,029 yards (731 rushing, 256 kickoff returning, 42 receiving)

References

Colgate
Colgate Raiders football seasons
Colgate Red Raiders football